Dyshypostena is a genus of flies in the family Tachinidae.

Species
Dyshypostena edwardsi (van Emden, 1960)
Dyshypostena tarsalis Villeneuve, 1939

References

Tachinidae
Taxa named by Joseph Villeneuve de Janti
Diptera of Africa